Jeptha Root Simms (December 31, 1807 – May 31, 1883) was an American historian best known for chronicling the settlement of upstate New York.

Personal life
Jeptha Root Simms was born at Canterbury, Connecticut on December 31, 1807, son of Joseph Simms and the former Phoebe Fitch.  His family moved to Plainfield, New York in 1824.  He married April 1, 1833, to Catherine Lawyer of Schoharie, New York.  He died May 31, 1883 in Fort Plain, New York, age 75.

Education
Mr. Simms was largely self-educated.  He became an acknowledged authority on the history and geology of upstate New York through years of personal interviews with the region’s oldest surviving residents and collecting fossils and mineral samples.  The interviews became the backbone of his subsequent writings, while his geological collection was eventually purchased by the State of New York for $5,000 (an impressive sum at the time).

Career
As a young man, Simms worked at Canajoharie, New York, but removed to New York City in 1829.  A few years later, he returned to upstate New York and began compiling his collection of historical material while working as a railroad ticket agent.

Bibliography
 The History of Schoharie County and Border Warfare (1845).
 The American Spy: Or, Freedom’s Early Sacrifice, A Tale of the Revolution Founded Upon Fact, (1846).
 
 Re:
<li> Nicholas Stoner 
<li> Nathaniel Foster
<li>   1850.          . .
<li>  1851; 2nd ed. . . 
<li>  1857; 3rd ed.
<li> 1960; 3rd ed.
<li>  1871; 3rd ed. .
 The Frontiersmen of New York: Showing Customs of the Indians, Vicissituds of the Pioneer White Settlers, and Border Strife in Two Wars (Volume 1 in 1882 and Volume 2 posthumously in 1883)

References

1807 births
1883 deaths
19th-century American historians
19th-century American male writers
Writers from New York (state)
American male non-fiction writers